Canville Township is a township in Neosho County, Kansas, in the United States.

A. B. Canville was a pioneer who settled in 1847 on Canville Creek.

References

Townships in Neosho County, Kansas
Townships in Kansas